Kenneth Newby (born 1956) is a Canadian media artist, composer-performer, educator, interaction designer, and audio producer based in British Columbia. He is known for his innovative use of technology in the creation of music, media performances, and installations. He is a research associate at the Center for Culture and Technology at the University of British Columbia, and Director of the Flicker Art Collaboratory at Frog Hollow, Mayne Island.

Early life
Newby was born in Victoria, British Columbia.

Career
Newby joined the research faculty in media arts at Simon Fraser University, where he was a member of the Computational Poetics research group with Aleksandra Dulic and Martin Gotfrit. At the University of the Fraser Valley he was Associate Professor in Media Arts., where he studied creative forces in the field of computational art.

Newby created performances and exhibits which integrated new media diffusion techniques and augmented reality systems, and he developed generative systems for the composition and performance of music and visual art.

In the 1990s Newby released several solo albums, including Ecology of Souls in 1993. He also collaborated on recordings with the groups Trance Mission and Lights in a Fat City.

In the 2004 Newby collaborated with the group Gamelan Madu Sari on their album of Javanese music, New Nectar, and later contributed to their live performance installation, "Semar's Journey", in Vancouver.

Newby's recent work is focussed on long-term projects in generative art including the development of the Flicker Computer Assisted Composition system — a computer-aided system for the composition and performance of contemporary classical music; and Becoming World — a project in generative visual art in collaboration with Aleksandra Dulic.

Newby also worked as an interactivity consultant for Pixar Animation Studios, and as a sound artist and audio software developer at Electronic Arts.

Discography
Solo

Trance Mission

Lights in a Fat City

Other appearances

References

External links
Review: Elegeia - Music for Mixed Ensembles, and Gamelan Semara Dana

1956 births
Living people
Musicians from Victoria, British Columbia
Canadian male composers
Canadian ambient musicians
Canadian experimental musicians
20th-century Canadian composers
20th-century Canadian male musicians
Academic staff of the University of the Fraser Valley